Klebang is a coastal town in Melaka Tengah District, Malacca, Malaysia. It is located along the Malacca Strait.

Tourist attractions
 1Malaysia Square - A town square near Klebang Beach and Submarine Museum, which was officiated by sixth Prime Minister of Malaysia Najib Razak in February 2012.
 Klebang Beach - A beach facing directly to the Strait of Malacca at the end of Klebang Peninsula.
 Submarine Museum

See also
 Geography of Malaysia

References

External links

 Malacca Tourist Attraction

Central Melaka District
Towns in Malacca